Gressingham is a civil parish in Lancaster, Lancashire, England. It contains 14 listed buildings that are recorded in the National Heritage List for England.  Of these, one is listed at Grade I, the highest of the three grades, two are at Grade II*, the middle grade, and the others are at Grade II, the lowest grade.  Apart from the village of Gressingham and the settlement of Eskrigge, the parish is rural.  Almost all the listed buildings are houses and associated structures, farmhouses, and farm buildings.  Also listed are a church and a bridge crossing the River Lune on the boundary of the parish.

Key

Buildings

References

Citations

Sources

Lists of listed buildings in Lancashire
Buildings and structures in the City of Lancaster